Marxist-Leninist League was a communist group in Norway, existing during the beginning of the 1980s. MLF was formed by a nucleus of young activists that had left the Communist Workers League. MLF was politically close to the Party of Labour of Albania.

MLF published Arbeideren and ran a bookstore with the same name.

MLF was dissolved by the mid-1980s, but the group later re-emerged as the Marxist-Leninist Group Revolusjon.

Communist parties in Norway
Defunct political parties in Norway
Political parties established in the 1980s
1980s establishments in Norway
Organizations disestablished in the 1980s